Simon Billig (born in Birmingham, England) is an English actor based out of both New York and Los Angeles.

Billig started in American television on Star Trek: Voyager as Ensign Hogan in the second and third seasons. He also had a recurring role in Babylon 5 and multiple appearances on Silk Stalkings. Other television credits include a long list of guest starring roles including, most recently, an episode of Third Watch.  In 2004, he had a recurring role on ABC's One Life to Live as Gerhardt.

Appearances

Television 
 A Family in Crisis: The Elian Gonzales Story (2000) (TV) .... Agent Parker
 Seven Days (episode "Last Card Up" {1999}) .... Joseph
 Dark Skies (episode "Strangers in the Night" {1997}) .... Dr. Carl Sagan
 Life's Work (episode "Contempt" {1996}) .... Trooper Jackson
 Star Trek: Voyager .... Ensign Hogan (7 episodes in 1996)

Film 
 Dean Quixote (2000) .... Guy Fox
 Bad City Blues (1999) .... Artie
 The Thin Red Line (1998) .... Lt. Col. Billig

Theatre 
 Plays Bill in "Lobby Hero" (February 2002, South Coast Repertory theatre, Costa Mesa, California)

External links 
 

Year of birth missing (living people)
English male film actors
English male television actors
Living people
People from Birmingham, West Midlands